Abraham is a 2015 Afrikaans-language South African drama film written and directed by Jans Rautenbach. It was Rautenbach's last film before his death. Abraham was released on 16 October 2015 in South Africa.

Premise 
A gifted sculptor living in poverty in a 1980s rural Kannaland tries to exploit his profession to earn enough money to feed his family.

Cast 
D.J. Mouton as Abraham
 as Jans
 as Almeri
Chantell Phillipus as Katie
Jill Levenberg as Beulah
Frans Lucas as Dirk

Reception 
The film received critical praise.

Daniel Dercksen, writing for The Writing Studio, praised the film, saying: "Abraham is a profound and consummate masterwork."

See also 
List of South African films

References

External links 

2015 films
Films directed by Jans Rautenbach
2015 drama films
South African drama films